Yuryevets is a rural locality (a village) in Yugskoye Rural Settlement, Cherepovetsky District, Vologda Oblast, Russia. The population was 3 as of 2002. There are 8 streets.

Geography 
Yuryevets  is located 12 km southeast of Cherepovets (the district's administrative centre) by road. Tsikovo is the nearest rural locality.

References 

Rural localities in Cherepovetsky District